Sachsenburg was a Nazi concentration camp in eastern Germany, located in Frankenberg, Saxony, near Chemnitz. Along with Lichtenburg, it was among the first to be built by the Nazis, and operated by the SS from 1933 to 1937. The camp was an abandoned four-story textile mill which was renovated in May 1933 to serve as a "protective custody" facility for dissidents such as Jehovah's Witnesses, who opposed the Nazi regime.

Sachsenburg was the first concentration camp in which SS used colored triangles sewn onto clothing, as well as armbands, to identify categories of prisoners. Details about the operation of Sachsenburg, held in 17 files (each containing several hundred SS reports) by the International Tracing Service, only became available to researchers in late 2006.

Indians
The Spanish author Emilio Calderón claims in his novel "La Bailarina y el Inglés" that in the town of Frankenberg the Nazis had a broadcasting facility that helped Subhas Chandra Bose, the assigned leader of India after the Endsieg, to propagate his ideological views to his countrymen all over the globe (see: La Bailarina y el Inglés by Emilio Calderón, ed. Grupo Planeta, Barcelona 2009). Bose was open to take help of Nazis and Japanese for Indian freedom movement and followed the principle of "Enemy of the Enemy is your Friend". The "Corps Freies Indien" and other Indian pro-independence organizations are supposed to have been centered there.

This is made more precise by the Lexikon der Deutschen Wehrmacht: the authors explain in their respective article that Frankenberg was only the second location of the Indian Legion, as they call it, after it had been founded. Later it was moved to another place near Dresden because Frankenberg was too small a military training ground to host a unit that was meant to grow up to the size of two battalions.

Interned people 

 Alfred Kästner

See also
Lichtenburg concentration camp

References

External links
Article about Sachsenburg (2006)
 Website Gedenkstätte Sachsenburg

Nazi concentration camps in Germany
Buildings and structures in Saxony
Frankenberg, Saxony